Esuma (Essouma) is an extinct language of uncertain classification within the Kwa branch of the Niger–Congo family, once spoken in the villages of Assinie (Asini) and Mafia in Ivory Coast. The Esuma were vassals of the Sanwi capital Krinjabo, and shifted to the Anyin and Nzima languages.

References

Languages of Ivory Coast
Kwa languages